Tony Michael Pierce (January 29, 1946 – January 31, 2013) was an American Major League Baseball pitcher. He played for the Kansas City/Oakland Athletics in –. In two Major League seasons, he appeared in 66 games played, nine as a starting pitcher, and 130⅓ innings pitched, allowing 118 hits and 40 bases on balls, with 77 strikeouts.

External links

 Baseball Digest feature story, July 1967

References

1946 births
2013 deaths
Baseball players from Georgia (U.S. state)
Columbus State Cougars baseball players
People from Brunswick, Georgia
Burlington Bees players
Kansas City Athletics players
Major League Baseball pitchers
Mobile A's players
Oakland Athletics players
Wytheville A's players